Age Ain't Nothing but a Number is the debut studio album by American singer Aaliyah. It was released on May 24, 1994, by Blackground Records and Jive Records. After being signed by her uncle Barry Hankerson, Aaliyah was introduced to recording artist and producer R. Kelly. He became her mentor, as well as the lead songwriter and producer of the album. The duo recorded the album at the Chicago Recording Company in Chicago periodically from January 1993 until early 1994.

Age Ain't Nothing but a Number received generally favorable reviews from critics. Many noted Aaliyah's vocal ability and praised the lyrical content. Aaliyah was credited for redefining R&B by blending her voice with Kelly's new jack swing. The album peaked at number 18 on the US Billboard 200 and has been certified double platinum by the Recording Industry Association of America (RIAA).The album has sold over three million copies in the United States and six million copies worldwide.

The album produced two US Billboard Hot 100 top-ten singles—"Back & Forth" and a cover of the 1976 Isley Brothers hit "At Your Best (You Are Love)"; both singles were certified gold by the RIAA. The title track was released as the third and final US single, while "Down with the Clique" and "The Thing I Like" were released as the fourth and fifth singles, respectively, in the United Kingdom.

Before Barry Hankerson signed a distribution deal between Blackground Records and Empire Distribution in August 2021, this work was the only studio album of Aaliyah’s  available for legal digital streaming. The rights to the album are owned by Sony Music, a legal successor of Zomba Group of Companies (the original owner of Jive Records).

Background and development
Aaliyah's uncle Barry Hankerson, who was an entertainment lawyer, had been married to Gladys Knight. As a child, Aaliyah traveled with Knight and worked with an agent in New York, where she auditioned for commercials and television programs, including the sitcom Family Matters. In 1989, she went on to appear on Star Search at the age of 10, where she performed "My Funny Valentine". Aaliyah chose to begin auditioning while her mother made the decision to have her surname dropped. By the age of 11, she had started appearing in concerts alongside Gladys Knight. For five nights, Aaliyah performed alongside Knight in Las Vegas; during the concerts, she would perform a number during the middle of Knight's set and would close the show by singing a duet with Knight. When speaking about her time performing with Knight, Aaliyah said "it was a great learning experience". She also recalled: "I learned a lot about being on stage and how audiences react differently to various songs". According to her: "I would stand in the middle of the stage, sing, and just walk off, Gladys said to me, 'You can't do that, you have to work the audience, make them feel what you feel'."

When Aaliyah was 12, Hankerson would take her to Vanguard Studios in her hometown of Detroit to record demos with record producer and Vanguard Studios' owner Michael J. Powell. In an interview, Powell stated: "At the time, Barry was trying to get Aaliyah a deal with MCA, and he came to me to make her demos." During her time recording with Powell, Aaliyah recorded several covers, such as "The Greatest Love of All", "Over the Rainbow", and "My Funny Valentine", which she had performed on Star Search. Eventually, Hankerson started shopping Aaliyah around to various labels, such as Warner Bros. and MCA Records; according to Hankerson, although the executives at both labels liked her voice, they ultimately didn't sign her. After several failed attempts with getting Aaliyah signed to a record label, Hankerson then shifted his focus on getting her signed to Jive Records, the label that R. Kelly, an artist he managed during that time, was signed to. According to former Jive Records A&R Jeff Sledge, Jive's former owner Clive Calder didn't want to sign Aaliyah at first, because he felt that a 12-year-old was too young to be signed to the label. Sledge stated in an interview: "The guy who owned Jive at the time, Clive Calder, he's also an A&R person by trade. He was basically head of the A&R department. Barry kept shopping her to him and he saw something, but he said, ‘She’s not ready, she’s still young, she needs to be developed more.’ Barry would go back and develop her more". After developing Aaliyah more as an artist, Hankerson finally signed a distribution deal with Jive, and he signed her to his own label Blackground Records. When Aaliyah finally got a chance to audition for the record executives at Jive, she sang "Vision of Love" by Mariah Carey.

Recording and production
By late 1992, Aaliyah was signed to both Blackground and Jive; Hankerson then introduced her to recording artist and producer R. Kelly. When the pair first met, Aaliyah sang an a cappella song for Kelly, which left him impressed with her voice and he decided that he wanted to work with her. He then became her mentor, as well as the sole songwriter and producer for her debut album. Kelly was the only writer and producer credited on the album because the record label didn't want multiple people to share publishing rights. According to Jeff Sledge, "Clive was a publishing guru, so he and Barry weren’t trying to cut a lot of people in on the album to share the publishing. They said we’re going to do this with one guy and the publishing will be easy to deal with because it’s one person". Once the issue over publishing was fixed, both Aaliyah and Kelly began recording the album in 1993 when she was 14 and, according to Aaliyah, it took about eight to nine months to record the album.

R. Kelly and Aaliyah worked on the record in Chicago during the summer while she was off from school for summer vacation; she would fly to Chicago from Detroit, and they would work on the album. While recording the album, the pair spent a lot of time hanging out together by going to arcades and bowling. This would help with the writing process because Kelly would "write the songs that fit her and what kids her age and her friends were talking about". According to Aaliyah, "He just spent time with me, trying to see how I thought about things and what people my age think". When discussing the writing process for the album, Aaliyah said: "We vibed off of one another, and that’s how the songs was built. He would vibe with me on what the lyrics should be. He’d tell me what to sing, and I’d sing it. That’s how the whole album was done". The duo recorded the first song "Old School" at the Chicago Recording Company in Chicago and it took at least two days to record. Aaliyah loved recording "Old School" because that song "had an Isley Brothers flair” to it. When discussing the recording process for the song, Aaliyah said: "At first, I had to get comfortable, but I had been around Robert [Kelly], so it was cool. Both Robert and I are perfectionists, and if you listen to the music, there is a lot of passion in it."

While recording the album, Kelly coached her as they worked several hours in the studio. She often sang the songs multiple times in order to achieve "excellence". When discussing the hectic hours recording the album, Aaliyah said: "We put in a lot of hours; as far as the music, we’d be in there all night making sure it was perfect. There were times when I was tired, but I knew I had to push on if I wanted to come off." Kelly claimed that Aaliyah was "one of the best young artists" he had worked with. During the recording process for the album, the record label was out of the loop in regards to the type of songs that were being recorded. Executives from the label didn't hear the album until it was finished, and they were impressed with the finished product. Sledge said: "When we finally heard the album we were blown away because the album was dope. It was basically like listening to an R. Kelly album, but with a little girl singing".

Music and lyrics
Aaliyah sang her songs in a falsetto on the album and felt that the songs "came at you kind of tough, a bit edgy, hip-hop, but the vocals can be very soothing". According to Aaliyah, "lyrically I want things to be different." The album is filled with "sunny" pop jams and "sweet" ballads, and opens with the intro track which is an a cappella public service announcement. The intro urges its listeners to listen to the album carefully: "Listen to instructions carefully / While bumping this album in your jeeps / Aaliyah’s got a '90s swing / So be careful with the volume, please". The next track, "Throw Your Hands Up", is an anthemic up-tempo G-funk-inspired song and has been described as Aaliyah's "statement of purpose". On the song, she tells the listeners that she's "straight from the streets" with a "touch of jazz" in her. The third track and the album's lead single "Back & Forth" has been described as being a Dance, pop, R&B and New jack swing song. On the song, Aaliyah sings with a "subtle, laid-back vocal" while she talks about partying on the weekend with her friends. According to Billboard, "It doesn't matter that Aaliyah is 15. It’s the freakin' weekend, baby, so she's picking up her ladies—presumably in her jeep—and hitting the local party spot". The fourth track "Age Ain't Nothing but a Number" is the title track for the album and it is about "a young girl pining for the love of an older man, and her telling society that it doesn’t matter the age difference between the two of them". The song contains an interpolation from the song "What You Won't Do for Love" performed by Bobby Caldwell with the lines "I got a thing for you, and I won’t let go.”

The fifth track "Down with the Clique" is a hip hop-inspired song and on the song, Aaliyah displays a "silky cooing" with her vocals. The sixth track "At Your Best (You Are Love)" is a cover of the song originally recorded by The Isley Brothers. The song was described as a "sweet", "vintage soul ballad" and it gave Aaliyah a chance to "ditch the tough-girl posturing" according to Billboard. The seventh track "No One Knows How to Love Me Quite Like You Do" has been described as a "sensually" up-tempo "crush" record and, lyrically, it is about Aaliyah being satisfied and how she is "made to feel like a goddess". When discussing the record, Aaliyah said "Every girl looks for that one person who is going to love them right. That song is saying, when it comes down to it, I like how you satisfy me." The song features a guest rap appearance from Tia Hawkins, who brings a "comic relief" with her raps, telling the listeners R. Kelly is "spitting tracks as if it were tobacco." The eighth track "I'm So into You" features another guest rap from Tia Hawkins. The ninth track "Street Thing" has been described as a "pretty standard slow jam" and it is about having devotion for another person. During the bridge of the song, Aaliyah sings about climbing the "highest mountain," and swimming the "deepest sea" to prove her devotion. The tenth track "Young Nation" is about Aaliyah "aligning herself with an entire movement". The eleventh track "Old School" is about merging an old school style with a new school style, the opening begins with "Here's the old school / With the new school". The final track "I'm Down" has been described as a mid-tempo rap-soul ballad and it is about "one person giving themselves fully to another".

Release and promotion
Aaliyah's record label didn't interfere with her image so she was granted free rein when it came to her imaging and style. Former Jive Records A&R Jeff Sledge mentioned in an interview that the promotional campaign was set up so that Aaliyah wouldn't have to change her image or style. When asked about the promotional plans for the album, Jive's senior vice president Barry Weiss said "there [would] be little in the way of marketing changes between the domestic and world promotion of the set". Speaking about Aaliyah's image, he said: "She is what she is the album has tremendous pop appeal to go along with her urban edge, so there's not a whole lot different that we'll be doing abroad". A month before the release of the album's lead single "Back & Forth", Aaliyah attended the Urban Network's "Power Jam" conference, where she was introduced and "received warmly". The album was originally scheduled for June 14, 1994, but due to the instant success of "Back & Forth"'s accompanying music video on MTV, the label was prompted to release the album three weeks earlier, on May 24. Following the album's release, Aaliyah embarked on a 1994–1995 world tour, visiting the United States, Europe, Japan and South Africa. Aside from touring internationally, Aaliyah performed at the Budweiser Superfest at the USAir Arena in September 1994. In January 1995, she performed "Age Ain't Nothing but a Number" on the Nickelodeon sketch comedy show All That. On May 1, 1995, Aaliyah made an appearance at the Virgin Megastore in London. Twelve days later on May 13, Aaliyah performed in concert at the Hammersmith Apollo in London. In July 1995 Aaliyah celebrated Essence magazine's 25th anniversary by performing at the magazine's first annual Essence Music Festival.

Singles
"Back & Forth" was released as the album's lead single on April 8, 1994. It reached its peak of number five on the US Billboard Hot 100 three months after it was released, on July 2, 1994. The single reached its peak of number one on the Hot R&B/Hip-Hop Songs on May 21, 1994, becoming first of the three number-one singles by Aaliyah on this chart. Eventually, the single was certified gold by the Recording Industry Association of America (RIAA) on June 9, 1994, selling 700,000 copies in the country. On June 26, 1994, the song reached number 4 on The Times Southern California pop singles chart.

Internationally, "Back & Forth" became a top-forty hit in the United Kingdom and the Netherlands, peaking at numbers 16 and 38, respectively. In New Zealand, the song peaked at number 48. The album's second single "At Your Best (You Are Love)" was released on August 22, 1994, and it became Aaliyah's second top-ten hit on the Billboard Hot 100, peaking at number six. On the Hot R&B/Hip-Hop Songs, the song also reached the top ten, peaking at number two. The song received a gold certification by the RIAA on October 25, 1994. In other international markets, "At Your Best (You Are Love)" reached numbers 27, 38 and 40 in the UK, New Zealand and the Netherlands, respectively. "Age Ain't Nothing but a Number" was released as the third single and the final US single from the album. It peaked at number 75 on the Billboard Hot 100 on February 25, 1995. The song fared better on the UK charts, peaking at number 32, as well as at numbers 19 and six on the dance and R&B charts, respectively. The album's fifth and sixth singles "Down with the Clique" and "The Thing I Like" were released exclusively in the UK. "Down with the Clique" peaked at numbers 32, 25 and five on the official, dance and R&B charts, respectively. "The Thing I Like" peaked at numbers 33, 15 and four on the official, dance and R&B charts, respectively.

Critical reception

Age Ain't Nothing but a Number received generally favorable reviews from music critics, some writers noted that Aaliyah's "silky vocals" and "sultry voice" blended with Kelly's new jack swing helped define R&B in the 1990s. Her sound was also compared to that of female quartet En Vogue. Christopher John Farley of Time magazine described the album as a "beautifully restrained work", noting that Aaliyah's "girlish, breathy vocals rode calmly on R.Kelly's rough beats". Stephen Thomas Erlewine of AllMusic felt that the album had its "share of filler," but described the singles as "slyly seductive." He also claimed that the songs on the album were "frequently better" than that of Kelly's debut studio album 12 Play.

Paul Verna from Billboard praised both R. Kelly's production on the album and Aaliyah's voice saying "The golden production touch of mentor R. Kelly is strongly felt here, and he has a field day with Aaliyah's warm silky voice, which has a depth and range that belie her youth." Music editors from RPM praised the album for being a "perfect female companion" to R. Kelly's 12 Play. The editors also felt that the album was filled with many "ear pleasing numbers" and that Aaliyah was next in line behind Whitney Houston, Mariah Carey and Toni Braxton as a "chart topping queen". Tonya Pendleton from The Washington Post felt that Aaliyah's voice "has the maturity of someone much older", also she thought Aaliyah stood out because of her "uniquely mellifluous tone". According to Pendleton "What makes her stand out is her uniquely mellifluous tone and the eloquent way she expresses the heartfelt passion of first love". Overall she felt that Age Ain’t Nothing but a Number "is that rarest of recordings — a collection well suited for its teenage target group, but one that even older listeners can relate to". Connie Johnson from the Los Angeles Times gave the album a 2 out of 4 rating. Johnson, felt that aside from “Back & Forth, the album was bland and that "As the mouthpiece of an adult male trying to express the thoughts of a pubescent girl, Aaliyah sounds trapped in an awkward stage". MTV.com praised the album and felt that "The album's other highlights are soft, mellow tunes like "At Your Best (You Are Love)," "Young Nation," "Age Ain't Nothing But A Number" and "Down With The Clique."

Accolades

Commercial performance
Age Ain't Nothing but a Number debuted at number 24 on the US Billboard 200 chart on the issue dated June 11, 1994, selling 38,000 copies in its first week. The album reached its peak at number 18 on June 18, 1994, and has spent a total of 37 weeks on the Billboard 200. On the US Top R&B/Hip-Hop Albums chart, the album debuted at number four. In its fourth week on the chart, the album peaked at number three during the week of July 2, 1994, spending a total of 41 weeks on the chart. By July 2001 the album had sold over three million copies in the United States according to Nielsen SoundScan. To date the album is certified double platinum by the Recording Industry Association of America (RIAA) for two million shipped units.

In Canada, the album debuted at number 29 on [[RPM (magazine)|RPM''' s Top Albums/CDs]] chart on July 18, 1994. In its 4th week on the chart, the album reached its peak at number 20 on August 8, 1994. Overall, the album has spent a total of 25 consecutive weeks on the Top Albums/CDs chart. On December 12, 1994, the album was certified gold by Music Canada for 50,000 copies shipped in the country. In the United Kingdom, the album peaked at numbers 23 and six on the UK Albums Chart and UK R&B Chart, respectively. Eventually, the album was certified gold in the UK by the British Phonographic Industry (BPI) for 100,000 copies in shipments. On other European charts, Age Ain't Nothing but a Number peaked at number 44 on Dutch Albums Chart and at number 90 on the European Top 100 Albums chart. In Japan, the album was certified gold by the Recording Industry Association of Japan (RIAJ) for shipments of 100,000 units. As of 2014, the album has sold 6 million copies worldwide, according to Vibe.

Controversy
With the release of Age Ain't Nothing but a Number, rumors circulated of a relationship between Aaliyah and R. Kelly. Shortly after, there was speculation about a secret marriage with the release of Age Ain't Nothing but a Number and the adult content that Kelly had written for Aaliyah. Vibe magazine later revealed a marriage certificate that listed the couple married on August 31, 1994, in Sheraton Gateway Suites in Rosemont, Illinois. Aaliyah, who was 15 at the time, was listed as 18 on the certificate; the illegal marriage was annulled in February 1995 by her parents. The pair continued to deny marriage allegations, stating that neither was married. One particular allegation among the rumor was that Aaliyah wedded Kelly without her parents' knowledge.

Aaliyah reportedly developed a friendship with Kelly during the recording of her debut album. As she recalled to Vibe magazine in 1994, she and Kelly would "go watch a movie" and "go eat" when she got tired and would then "come back and work". She described the relationship between her and Kelly as being "rather close". In 2016, Kelly said that he was in love with Aaliyah as he was with "anybody else".
In December 1994, Aaliyah told the Sun-Times that whenever she was asked about being married to Kelly, she urged them not to believe "all that mess" and that she and Kelly were "close" and "people took it the wrong way".
In his 2011 book The Man Behind the Man: Looking From the Inside Out, Demetrius Smith Sr., a former member of Kelly's entourage, wrote that Kelly told him "in a voice that sounded as if he wanted to burst into tears" that he thought Aaliyah was pregnant.

Jamie Foster Brown in the 1994 issue of Sister 2 Sister wrote that "R. Kelly told me that he and Aaliyah got together and it was just magic." Brown also reported hearing about a relationship between them. "I've been hearing about Robert and Aaliyah for a while—that she was pregnant. Or that she was coming and going in and out of his house. People would see her walking his dog, 12 Play, with her basketball cap and sunglasses on. Every time I asked the label, they said it was platonic. But I kept hearing complaints from people about her being in the studio with all those men." Brown later added "at 15, you have all those hormones and no brains attached to them."

Aaliyah admitted in court documents that she had lied about her age. In May 1997, she filed suit in Cook County seeking to have all records of the marriage expunged because she was not old enough under state law to get married without her parents' consent. It was reported that she cut off all professional and personal ties with Kelly after the marriage was annulled and ceased having contact with him. In 2014, Jomo Hankerson stated that Aaliyah "got villainized" over her relationship with Kelly and the scandal over the marriage made it difficult to find producers for her second album. "We were coming off of a multi-platinum debut album and except for a couple of relationships with Jermaine Dupri and Puffy, it was hard for us to get producers on the album." Hankerson also expressed confusion over why "they were upset" with Aaliyah given her age at the time.

Aaliyah was known to avoid answering questions regarding Kelly following the professional split. During an interview with Christopher John Farley, she was asked if she was still in contact with him and if she would ever work with him again. Farley said Aaliyah responded with a "firm, frosty 'no'" to both of the questions. Vibe'' magazine said Aaliyah changed the subject any time "you bring up the marriage with her". A spokeswoman for Aaliyah said in 2000 that when "R. Kelly comes up, she doesn't even speak his name, and nobody's allowed to ask about it at all". Kelly later commented that Aaliyah had opportunities to address the pair's relationship after they separated professionally but chose not to.

R. Kelly would have other allegations made about him regarding underage girls in the years following her death, and his marriage to Aaliyah was used to evidence his involvement with them. He has refused to discuss his relationship with her, citing her death. "Out of respect for her, and her mom and her dad, I will not discuss Aaliyah. That was a whole other situation, a whole other time, it was a whole other thing, and I'm sure that people also know that." Aaliyah's mother, Diane Haughton, reflected that everything "that went wrong in her life" began with her relationship with Kelly. However, the allegations have been said to have done "little to taint Aaliyah's image or prevent her from becoming a reliable '90s hitmaker with viable sidelines in movies and modeling."

Track listing
All songs were written and produced by R. Kelly, except for "At Your Best (You Are Love)", written by Ernie Isley, Marvin Isley, O'Kelly Isley, Jr., Ronald Isley, Rudolph Isley and Chris Jasper of The Isley Brothers.

Personnel
Credits adapted from the album's liner notes.

Aaliyah – vocals
Timmy Allen – bass
Lafayette Carthon – keyboards
Tom Coyne – mastering
Stephanie Edwards – background vocals
Barry Hankerson – executive producer
Tia Hawkins – vocals
Keith Henderson – guitar
Stephanie Huff – background vocals
Ernie Isley – composer
Marvin Isley – composer
O'Kelly Isley – composer
Ronald Isley – composer
Chris Jasper – composer
R. Kelly – composer, guest artist, instrumentation, mixing, producer, vocals
Doug McBride – mixing assistant
Mr. Lee – mixing
Peter Mokran – engineer, mixing, programming
Joshua Shapera – mixing assistant
Stefon Taylor – mixing assistant
Maria Valencia – design

Charts

Weekly charts

Year-end charts

Certifications

|-

Release history

See also
 Album era

References

Bibliography

External links
 

1994 debut albums
Aaliyah albums
Albums produced by R. Kelly
Jive Records albums
New jack swing albums